John is a play from Pulitzer Prize winning American playwright Annie Baker. The show premiered off-Broadway at New York's Signature Theatre Company in 2015, and was directed by Sam Gold. Time ranked John as one of its top 10 plays and musicals of 2015, where it took the number four spot. The play also reached number eight on the Hollywood Reporter's list of the "Best New York Theatre of 2015."

The off-Broadway production was nominated for numerous awards, including five nods at the 2016 Lucille Lortel Awards: Outstanding Play; Outstanding Lead Actress in a Play (Georgia Engel); Outstanding Featured Actress in a Play (Lois Smith); Outstanding Scenic Design (Mimi Lien); and Outstanding Lighting Design (Mark Barton). John was also nominated for six Drama Desk Awards in 2016: Outstanding Play; Outstanding Actress in a Play (Georgia Engel); Outstanding Director of a Play; Outstanding Set Design for a Play (Mimi Lien); Outstanding Lighting Design for a Play (Mike Barton); and Outstanding Sound Design in a Play (Bray Poor). At the 2016 Obie Awards, John Georgia Engel won in the performance category, while Annie Baker, Sam Gold and the design team won a Special Citation for Collaboration.

Canadian premiere 
The Company Theatre (TCT) brought the Canadian premiere of John to Canadian Stage's Berkeley Street Theatre in 2017. Directed by Jonathan Goad, a member of TCT's ensemble, John starred TCT's co-Artistic Director Philip Riccio as Elias and Loretta Yu as Jenny. Nancy Beatty played Mertis, the owner of the B&B Elias and Jenny visit, while Nora McLellan took on the role of Genevieve, Mertis' Blind friend. The critically acclaimed production boasted a familiar creative team, with Kevin Lamotte (lighting design: Belleville, 2014; Domesticated, 2015), Michael Laird (sound design: Marion Bridge, 2007; Festen, 2008; Through the Leaves, 2010; Speaking in Tongues, 2012/13), and Michael Sinclair (stage management: Speaking in Tongues, 2012/13; Belleville, 2014; Domesticated, 2015) all returning to the TCT. Shannon Lea Doyle, a TCT newcomer, designed the production's set.

The production was nominated for four 2017 Dora Mavor Moore Awards in the Independent Theatre category: Riccio received a nod for Outstanding Performance Male, both Beatty and McLellan were nominated for Outstanding Performance Female, and Doyle was nominated for Outstanding Set Design. McLellan and Doyle won in their respective categories. John was also picked up three awards at the 2017 Toronto Theatre Critics Awards: Best Supporting Actress (McLellan), Best International Play, and Best Production (John tied with Ex Machina/Canadian Stage's production of Robert LePage's 887 ).

References 

2015 plays
Off-Broadway plays